Mohammed Hamzah Sheeraz (born 25 May 1999) is a British professional boxer who has held the WBO European light-middleweight title since 2019.

Early career

Sheeraz was born on 25 May 1999 in Slough in Berkshire, England into a family of fighters. His grandfather and uncle were both boxers, the latter winning ten national amateur titles for the Slough and Pinewood Star clubs. Sheeraz is a Muslim, born to a Pakistani father and an Indian mother. 

Sheeraz was first directed to a gym by his uncle at the age of eight and had his first bout at 12. He went on to become a three-time finalist at the national junior championships. However, he became disillusioned with the sport after being overlooked for the Commonwealth Youth championships and took a year off to focus on an electrician's apprenticeship. A meeting with his then-trainer Lenny Butcher led him to come back and try his hand as a professional.

Professional career
Sheeraz turned professional in 2017, signing a deal with Frank Warren's Queensberry Promotions on his eighteenth birthday. He made his pro debut on 16 September 2017 on the undercard of the Billy Joe Saunders–Willie Monroe Jr. world title fight at the Copper Box Arena in London. He defeated 35-year-old journeyman Duane Green via technical knockout (TKO) in the second round for his first victory. By the beginning of 2019 he was sporting a 6–0 record. He dropped Rod Douglas Jr. three times en route to a first-round TKO in March before stopping Ladislav Nemeth in the second round of their April bout at Wembley Arena. He registered his third-straight TKO victory on 13 July, beating Scott James in under two minutes on the undercard of the Daniel Dubois–Nathan Gorman British heavyweight title fight at The O2 Arena in London.

On 30 November 2019, Sheeraz defeated "Ruthless" Ryan Kelly (14–2, 7 KO) by sixth-round TKO for the vacant WBO European junior-middleweight title. Late in the sixth round of their fight at Arena Birmingham, he dropped his opponent with a straight right hand. Kelly got up but was forced back onto the ropes as Sheeraz threw a barrage of punches that he was not able to overcome. The referee stopped the fight with two seconds left in the round, giving Sheeraz his first title belt as a professional. The win also moved him into the top 15 in the WBO rankings.

He was scheduled to defend his title against undefeated Scottish prospect Paul Kean in April 2020, but the bout was postponed due to the COVID-19 pandemic.

Professional boxing record

Personal life
Sheeraz’s family originates from the village of Matore, in the Kahuta Tehsil, located in Rawalpindi District of Punjab, Pakistan.

He is also a lifelong Arsenal fan.

References

Living people
1999 births
English male boxers
English people of Indian descent
British sportspeople of Pakistani descent
British sportspeople of Indian descent
Light-middleweight boxers
Sportspeople from Slough
People from Ilford
English Muslims
English people of Pakistani descent